The 2000–01 DFB-Pokal was the 58th season of the annual German football cup competition. 64 teams competed in the tournament of six rounds which began on 25 August 2000 and ended on 26 May 2001. In the final Schalke 04 defeated third tier Union Berlin 2–0 thereby claiming their third title.

Matches

First round

Second round

Round of 16

Quarter-finals

Semi-finals

Final

References

External links
 Official site of the DFB 
 Kicker.de 

2000-01
2000–01 in German football cups